Juan Martinez (born 1985), better known by his stage name Down AKA Kilo, is an American rapper from Oxnard, California.

Martinez was born in Oxnard; his parents were undocumented immigrants from Mexico. Growing up, he listened to Cypress Hill and N.W.A and began rapping at age 13. He made his first recordings at the garage of childhood friend Edward "E-Dub" Rios, who would later become producer of the Power 106 radio show Pocos Pero Locos. He released his debut album California Cowboyz in 2003, and his second album Definition of an Ese in 2007, with two singles from the album, "Lean like a Cholo" and "Definition of an Ese."

On March 28, 2009, Down was injured in a car accident at Farmington, New Mexico and put in a coma while hospitalized.

Discography

Albums

Singles

References

1985 births
Living people
American rappers of Mexican descent
Musicians from Oxnard, California
Rappers from California
Universal Records artists
Gangsta rappers
21st-century American rappers
American male rappers
21st-century American male musicians